Stewart Johnson may refer to:

Stewart Johnson (diplomat), American diplomat
Stew Johnson, basketball player
Staz Johnson (Stewart Johnson), English comic book artist and penciller